Bruner is a surname. Notable people with the surname include:

Al Bruner (1923–1987), cofounder of Global TV
Bud Bruner (1907–1996), American boxing manager
Carlton Bruner (born 1972), American swimmer
Charlotte H. Bruner (1917–1999), American academic and translator
Cliff Bruner (1915–2000), American fiddler and band leader
Elwood Bruner (1854–1915), American politician
Ervin M. Bruner (1915–2008), American politician
F. Dale Bruner (born 1932), American biblical scholar
Jack Bruner (1924–2003), American baseball pitcher
Jerome Bruner (1915–2016), American psychologist
Lawrence Bruner (1856–1937), American entomologist
Mike Bruner (born 1956), American Olympic swimmer
Peter Bruner (1845–1938), American ex-slave and memoirist
Robert Bruner, business professor
Ronald Bruner Jr., American drummer and composer
Roy Bruner (1917–1986), American baseball pitcher
Stephen Bruner aka Thundercat (born 1984), American bassist and singer
Teel Bruner (born 1964), American football player
Wally Bruner (1931–1997), American journalist and television host

See also 
 Brunner (disambiguation)
 Bruener (disambiguation)
 Brüner, see Bruener (disambiguation)